Janet Christine Graham (born 4 June 1948) is an English composer, music educator and music therapist.

Life
Graham was born in Consett, County Durham, and studied composition at the Royal Academy of Music from 1966–70 with James Iliff. After her time at the Royal Academy of Music, she began teaching piano at the Mid Hertfordshire Music Centre while continuing to compose and study with Elisabeth Lutyens. She married organist Philip Redpath Deane on 8 September 1973. In 1978,two of her pieces were selected for the BBC Young Composers' Forum. In 1986 Graham began volunteering at a fortnightly musical evening at a local psychiatric hospital.

After two years of training at the Nordoff Robbins Centre in London, Graham became a music therapist in 1990 and was a therapist and tutor there for 17 years. In 2007 she moved to the Nordoff Robbins North East where she became Head Music Therapist. Here, Graham established new music therapy projects and lead local courses at hospitals and care homes; she particularly worked with autistic children and adults as well as elderly people with dementia. After retiring from music therapy in 2013, Graham began composing again and playing music with local groups.

In 2004, Janet Graham published a research project in the British Journal of Learning Disabilities titled, Communicating with the Uncommunicative: Music Therapy with Pre-verbal Adults, in which she found improvement of two patients' general communication abilities.

Works
Selected works include:
Pieces for organ: No.1, Prelude
Pieces for organ: No.2, Lament
Pieces for organ: No.3, Toccata
North East Hauntings. 1. Snow Sky
North East Hauntings. 2. Sea Mist
North East Hauntings. 3. Lullaby for Lost Skylines
North East Hauntings. 4. Red Dust
Quartet for flute, violin, viola and cello
Evening Flights
Soliloquium
This Great and Wide Sea
Persephone
Crux
Epitaphs
Diversitas
Atque in perpetuum
Cras amet
When I Was Young
The Light
Ca' Hawkie through the water
Cradle Song
Eighty Notes for James
Quest
Earth Cry
Tractor and Plough
From Dusk to Dawn
Two Winter Songs
Two Christmas Motets
Until the Sunset Hour
Iris
Hecate
Four Pieces for Four Bass Clarinets
Canta mihi aliquid
Three Pieces
String Quartet No. 4

Her music has been recorded and issued on CD, including:
Contemporary Music for Organ Performer: Kevin Bowyer, Audio CD (March 23, 1999) Nimbus Records, ASIN: B00000IGNJ

References

1948 births
20th-century classical composers
20th-century English composers
20th-century English women musicians
British women classical composers
English classical composers
Living people
British music educators
Women music educators
20th-century women composers